Mykkele Thompson (born April 22, 1993) is a former American football cornerback. He played college football at Texas.

Early years
Thompson attended John Paul Stevens High School in San Antonio, Texas.

College career
Thompson played at Texas from 2011 to 2014.

Professional career

New York Giants
Thompson was drafted by the New York Giants in the fifth round of the 2015 NFL Draft. On August 14, 2015, Thompson tore his Achilles tendon during the preseason opener against the Cincinnati Bengals. On the following day, Giants' head coach Tom Coughlin confirmed the injury and announced Thompson would miss the rest of the season.

On September 20, 2016, Thompson was placed on injured reserve with a knee injury.

On August 10, 2017, Thompson was waived/injured by the Giants and placed on injured reserve. He was released on September 5, 2017.

New Orleans Saints
On December 29, 2017, Thompson was signed to the New Orleans Saints' practice squad. He signed a reserve/future contract with the Saints on January 16, 2018. He was waived on May 31, 2018.

Winnipeg Blue Bombers
On February 1, 2019 it was announced that Thompson signed with Winnipeg Blue Bombers.

References

External links
 Texas Longhorns bio

1993 births
Living people
American football safeties
Winnipeg Blue Bombers players
New Orleans Saints players
New York Giants players
Texas Longhorns football players
Players of American football from San Antonio
Players of Canadian football from San Antonio